The 1915 season, and 7th of Auckland Rugby League saw the First Grade competition begin on 8 May featuring the same 6 senior clubs who had competed in 1914.

The First World War was in full effect by the time the 1915 season began. War had been declared just as the 1914 rugby league season was concluding in August 1914. As a result, several efforts were made during the 1915 season by the Auckland Rugby League to raise funds for Auckland Hospital Ship and Wounded Soldiers Relief Fund.

On 12 June, a seven-a-side tournament was arranged to be played at Victoria Park to raise money for the Auckland Hospital Ship and Wounded Relief Fund. In total £200 was raised with "almost 1,000 people" in attendance. All senior clubs entered teams and the final was played between North Shore Albions and City Rovers though the match was not completed owing to the fact that some earlier matches went to extra-time and the final saw an injury requiring a stoppage. As it had become dark it was decided to call the game off with North Shore leading by 3pts. A further £35 was raised from the 19 June round of matches at Victoria Park for the same cause.

Grafton Athletic were crowned First Grade champions for the first time after defeating City Rovers 10–5 in the championship final at Victoria Park in front of 4,000 spectators.

News

Mangere Rangers
On April 14 the Mangere Rangers rugby league club was registered. They were a junior club made up predominantly of Māori players and they fielded one team in the 1915 season in the Second grade. They finished in the top half of the standings behind City Rovers and Remuera. Their secretary for their first season was A. Te Meti. They only lasted 'one season' and a letter was written to the league in June, 1916 informing them that the club had ceased to exist and all players from their second grade side were free to play for other sides. However in 1918 they again entered a side in the second grade. Then in 1919 they were being coached by Jim Rukutai.

The beginning of the Roope Rooster 
A trophy which is still played for today saw its beginnings in the 1915 season. Namely the Roope Rooster trophy which was donated by Mr. Pauntley Whittington (Dick) Roope. It was a knockout competition with one round of matches before semi-finals were played. With the semi-final between Newton and Grafton being drawn (after North Shore received the bye) the management committee decided rather than replaying a match between the same teams there would be more interest in a match between Grafton and North Shore, with Newton progressing to the final. The second semi-final was played at Victoria Park and saw both teams wearing white armbands in memory of 3 men killed in action at the Dardanelles who had played club rugby league in Auckland (Charles Savory from Ponsonby United, Charles James Hally from Otahuhu, and William Moeki from City Rovers). A charge was made for the semi-final between North Shore and Grafton with the proceeds going to the Door of Hope, the Salvation Army Maternity and Rescue Homes, Sister Esther's Relief Work, and the St John Ambulance Brigade. The final was played on 11 September at Victoria Park between North Shore Albions and Newton Rangers, with North Shore winning 10 points to 7.

1st Grade championship (Myers Cup)
The 1st grade championship had been competing for the Myers Cup from 1910 to 1914 but after the beginning of the war the league decided to not award trophies though the grade competitions were still competed for as normal. Twenty eight matches were played in the 1st grade competition. Nine full rounds were played followed by the final. Victoria Park was the main ground used, with matches also played at the Auckland Domain, Devonport Domain, and Otahuhu.

1st Grade standings
{|
|-
|

1st Grade fixtures

Round 1

Round 2

Round 3

Round 4 
In the match between Ponsonby and Otahuhu following a penalty being awarded to Ponsonby Arthur Hardgrave threw the ball and it struck the referee. It was unclear if this was accidental or deliberate according to the NZ Herald reporter of the time.

Round 5

Round 6

Round 7 
In the match between Newton and North Shore both Kiwi international Stan Walters, and Roope were sent off for "rough play".

Round 8

Round 9

Championship final

Roope Rooster knockout competition
Newton, Grafton and North Shore were round 1 victors and North Shore received a bye meaning they should have advanced to the final directly. However Grafton and Newton played out a 2–2 draw in their semi-final. Rather than play a replay the league decided to have a second semi-final match between Grafton and North Shore, with Newton progressing to the final. North Shore beat Grafton and then defeated Newton in the final to win the inaugural Roope Rooster trophy which is still played for today.

Round 1

Semi-final

Semi-final

Final

Top try scorers and point scorers
The following point scoring lists include both Senior Championship matches and the Roope Rooster competition. Unlike in previous seasons where there were several matches with incomplete scoring lists the 1915 season was well reported by the New Zealand Herald and only two tries were unattributed (one for Ponsonby and one for Newton). For the second year in a row the outstanding Karl Ifwersen easily topped the point scoring lists.

Charity Carnival
Then on 3 July a "Patriotic Carnival" was held involving the Auckland Hockey Association, Auckland Rugby League, Auckland Rugby Union, and the Auckland Football Association. In addition there was a golf competition and a school basketball competition. Over 15,000 people crammed into the Auckland Domain to watch the matches. In the league matches Grafton Athletic defeated City Rovers by 15 points to 10. For Grafton tries were scored by Bob Mitchell, Roope (2), and Tom Haddon, while for City George Asher and William Mincham scored tries with Ernie Asher kicking a conversion and penalty. In the second grade match City Rovers beat Mangere 8 points to 3, and in the fourth grade match the Manukau Rovers defeated Ponsonby United by 8 points to 3 also.

Charity seven-a-side tournament results

Lower grades
The lower grades consisted of second, third, fourth, and for the first time a fifth grade. New teams included Thames Old Boys, made up of players from Thames who had settled in Auckland, and Richmond who were affiliated with the Eden Ramblers club.

J. Endean donated a shield to be awarded to the winner of the fourth grade competition in memory of his brother, Arthur Endean who had been killed in action at the Dardanelles. The shield would be named the Trooper Arthur Endean Shield.

Second grade standings

Northcote withdrew after 5 rounds.
{|
|-
|

Third grade standings
The majority of the Sunnyside B team enlisted during the season and this meant they could no longer field a team. The remaining players transferred to their A side. The North Shore side also withdrew in late August for the same reason.
{|
|-
|

Fourth grade standings (Endean Shield)
Sunnyside won with a record of 11 wins, 1 draw and 1 loss, 215 points for and 36 against. The Grafton Athletic side withdrew after 3 rounds, while the Newton Rangers withdrew after 7 rounds and City Rovers a week later.
{|
|-
|

Fifth grade standings
Remuera withdrew after the first round, Sunnyside withdrew after round 3, while Richmond withdrew after 4 rounds. City rovers had reportedly scored 220 points and conceded 0 after their August 28 win over Otahuhu, however they had won the match 12-2, and early won a match with Newton 5-3, so the record was more likely 220-5 at this point. They then defeated Ponsonby 17-0, with their final match score not reported.

Auckland Rugby League seasons
Auckland Rugby League